Wirdum may refer to several places:
 Wirdum, Germany, a municipality in Lower Saxony
 Wirdum, Friesland, a village in the Dutch province of Friesland
 Wirdum, Groningen, a village in the Dutch province of Groningen